Curtitoma finmarchia is a species of sea snail, a marine gastropod mollusk in the family Mangeliidae.

Description

Distribution
This marine species occurs in the Northwest Atlantic Ocean (esp. off Norway).

References

 Merkuljev A.V. (2017). Taxonomic puzzle of Propebela arctica (A. Adams, 1855) (Gastropoda, Mangeliidae) - six different species under single name. Ruthenica. 27(1): 15–30

External links

finmarchia